The 2002 Polish local elections were held in two parts, with the first round on 27 October and the second on 10 November 2002. All 16 provincial voivodeship sejmiks, 314 powiat county councils, 2,748 Gmina municipal councils, and town and city mayors were up for election. The event was the first of its kind to allow direct elections for mayors of municipalities. The local polls followed one year after the decisive victory of the Democratic Left Alliance in the 2001 parliamentary elections, and were seen as a test to the popularity of the Democratic Left Alliance and Polish People's Party coalition government under Prime Minister Leszek Miller.

Voivodship councils

Civic Platform and Law and Justice stood together in the POPiS alliance in 14 voivodeships; they were elected separately in Masovia and stood on another list in Podkarpacie.

References

External links
National Electoral Commission - 2002 results

2002
2002 elections in Poland
October 2002 events in Europe
November 2002 events in Europe